20,000 Leagues Across the Land  ( or "Léon Garros Is Looking for His Friend") is a 1961 Soviet-French feature film by Marcello Pagliero.

Plot 
During the Second World War Leon Garros and Boris Vaganov escape from a Nazi concentration camp. After 15 years as a journalist Leon with buddies visits the Soviet Union to make a report and accidentally finds Boris. But Boris is not in Moscow, and for the sake of meeting a friend Leon has to take a car halfway across the country... Traveling with the foreigners is translator Nikolai, who in turn is looking for Natasha, his brother's runaway bride.

Actors 
 Léon Zitrone as Léon Garros, journalist
 Yuri Belov as Nikolay Savin, translator
 Tatiana Samoilova as Natasha, singer
 Jean Rochefort as Fernand
 Jean Gaven as Gregoire
 Valentin Zubkov as Alexey Savin, polar aviator and Natasha's groom
 Evgeny Burenkov as Boris Vaganov
 Lyudmila Marchenko as elevator woman in the hotel "Ukraine"
 Antonina Maksimova as chairman of the kolkhoz
 Vladimir Ivashov as Fyodor, a young worker in Bratsk
 Valentina Kutsenko as Olga
 Nina Nikitina as mother of Fyodor
 Margarita Zharova as maid
 Alexei Vanin as theatrically
 Tamara Yarenko as Claudia, hotel receptionist
 Zinovy Gerdt as voiceover

External links 
 Кадры из фильма
 

1961 films
1961 drama films
French drama films
Soviet drama films
Russian drama films
Films directed by Marcello Pagliero
1960s multilingual films
French multilingual films
Soviet multilingual films
1960s French films